City Trade House is a building in Tsentralny City District of Novosibirsk, Russia. It is located at Krasny Avenue. The building was designed by architect Andrey Kryachkov.

History
The City Trade House was built in 1910–1911.

In Tsarist times, the building was occupied by various shops and the city government.

Since 1985 the Novosibirsk State Museum of Local Lore occupies the building.

Gallery

Bibliography

References

Tsentralny City District, Novosibirsk
Buildings and structures in Novosibirsk
Buildings and structures completed in 1911
Cultural heritage monuments of federal significance in Novosibirsk Oblast